German recording artist Alexander Klaws has released six studio albums and fourteen singles. In 2003, he won the inaugural season of the television competition Deutschland sucht den Superstar and was immediately signed to a recording deal with Sony BMG. He made his solo chart debut in March 2003 with the "Take Me Tonight", which topped the German and Swiss singles chart and became the second biggest-selling single of the year in Germany. His debut album, Take Your Chance, was released in April 2003 and debuted atop the German albums chart. It was certified in three countries, including a gold certification by the Bundesverband Musikindustrie (BVMI). Its second single, "Stay with Me" entered the top ten in Germany. In 2004, Klaws released his second album, Here I Am. It debuted at number one in Germany and produced four singles, from which three became top five entries, including "Free Like the Wind", his second number one hit single, and "Behind the Sun", which reached number two on the German singles chart.

Trying to reinvent his own image, Clarkson decided to part ways with the DSDS management and developed a more pop rock-oriented sound for his third album, Attention! (2006). It reached the top twenty of the album charts in Austria and Germany, becoming the singer's lowest–charting album then. Attention! spawned two singles, including "All (I Ever Want)", a duet with singer Sabrina Weckerlin, and leading single "Not Like You". Following his transition into the musical theater profession and a label change, Klaws released his first German album Was willst du noch?! in 2008. A moderate success, it peaked at number 23 on the German albums chart. Für alle Zeiten, his fifth album, was released in 2011.

Albums

Studio albums

Singles

References

External links
  
 

Discographies of German artists